"Christmas Eve" is a song by the American singer Kelly Clarkson. Written by Clarkson with Jason Halbert, who produced it, it is a  Christmas-themed song about witnessing the festive joys of the Christmas season, primarily on Christmas Eve. Released as a companion track to Clarkson's children's book River Rose and the Magical Christmas, it was later issued as a single by Atlantic Records on November 30, 2017. The song is included on Clarkson's second Christmas album When Christmas Comes Around... (2021).

Background and release 
Lyrically, the song is a celebration of the Christmas season. It was intended to accompany the release of Clarkson's second children's book River Rose and the Magical Christmas which, unlike its predecessor, River Rose and the Magical Lullaby, has a full original song unrelated to the accompanying material. Clarkson wrote the track from the perspective of elves making preparations for the holiday, while also proposing it as a prospective inclusion on her Christmas album Wrapped in Red (2013).

"Christmas Eve" was originally released by Atlantic Records o October 20, 2017, four days before the release of The Magical Christmas. A live recording of the song was also issued as a single exclusively on the Spotify streaming service on November 30, 2017. Clarkson revealed that she did not intend the record to be a single, but a positive response from the public prompted Atlantic to release it. She remarked, "It's literally so fun to sing and it just kind of puts you in this happy mood that gets you ready for Christmas," and added that "it's cool because it was like a happy accident. It wasn't supposed to even be, like, a big thing".

Reception 
Billboards Tatiana Tenreyro observed that the song's bells and a jubilant horn-filled melody capture the magic of the holidays. Entertainment Weekly described it as a joyful and uplifting song that masterfully showcases her voice, accompanied by the sounds of tambourines, drums, and jingle bells.

In the US, "Christmas Eve" made its debut chart appearance on the Billboard Adult Contemporary chart, where it reached number two, becoming her first top two hit since "Wrapped in Red" in 2014. Elsewhere, it charted on the Billboard Canada AC, Billboard Canada Hot AC, and the national charts of Austria and Germany.

Track listing 
Digital download

Digital streaming

Personnel 
Credits taken from Tidal.

 Lead vocals – Kelly Clarkson
 Backing vocals – Bridget Sarai, Jessi Collins
 Songwriters – Kelly Clarkson, Jason Halbert
 Arranger and conductor – Joseph Trapanese
 Producer, organ and piano – Jason Halbert
 Mixing engineer – John Hanes
 Mastering engineers – Chris Gehringer, Will Quinnell
 Engineers – Shane Wilson, Nick Spezia, John Denosky, Jason Halbert
 Bass – Craig Nelson, Mark Hill, Jack Jezzerio
 Cello	– Anthony Lamarchina, Kevin Bate, Sari Reist, Nicholas Gold
 Contractor – Alan Umstead
 Coordinator – Booker White
 Drums – Lester Estelle

 Flute – Leslie Fagan, Erik Gratton
 French Horn – Jennifer Kummer, Anna Spina
 Guitar – Aben Eubanks
 Mixer	– Serban Ghenea
 Percussion – Ron Sorbo
 Saxophone – Jimmy Bowland
 Timpani – Ron Sorbo
 Viola	– Charles Dixon, Hari Bernstein, Bruce Christensen, Jim Grosjean, Idalynn Besser, Shu-Zheng
 Violin – Ryan Cockman, Isabel Bartles, Jung-Min Shin, Amy Helman, Maria Conti, Mary Kathryn Vanosdale, Janet Darnall, Gerald Greer, Conni Ellisor, Bruce Wethey, Alan Umstead, Erin Hall, Alicia Enstrom, Peter Povey, Karen Winkelmann, Jenny Bifano, Catherine Umstead, Ali Gooding

Charts

Weekly charts

Year-end charts

Release history

References 

2017 songs
2017 singles
American Christmas songs
Atlantic Records singles
Kelly Clarkson songs
Songs written by Kelly Clarkson
Songs written by Jason Halbert